The 2014 Copa Sudamericana Finals were the two-legged final that decided the winner of the 2014 Copa Sudamericana, the 13th edition of the Copa Sudamericana, South America's secondary international club football tournament organized by CONMEBOL.

The finals were contested in two-legged home-and-away format between Colombian team Atlético Nacional and Argentine team River Plate. The first leg was hosted by Atlético Nacional at Estadio Atanasio Girardot in Medellín on 3 December 2014, while the second leg was hosted by River Plate at Estadio Antonio Vespucio Liberti in Buenos Aires on 10 December. The winner qualified for the 2015 Copa Libertadores, and earned the right to play against the 2014 Copa Libertadores winners in the 2015 Recopa Sudamericana, and against the 2014 J. League Cup winners in the 2015 Suruga Bank Championship.

The first leg ended in a 1–1 draw. The second led ended with a 2–0 win for River Plate, and they won the tournament for the first time in their history.

Qualified teams

Road to the finals

Note: In all scores below, the score of the home team is given first.

Format
The finals were played on a home-and-away two-legged basis, with the higher-seeded team hosting the second leg. If tied on aggregate, the away goals rule was used, and 30 minutes of extra time was played. If still tied after extra time, the penalty shoot-out was used to determine the winner.

Match details

First leg

Second leg

See also
2015 Recopa Sudamericana
2015 Suruga Bank Championship

References

External links
 
Copa Sudamericana, CONMEBOL.com 

Finals
2014
Atlético Nacional matches
Club Atlético River Plate matches
2014 in Colombian football
2014 in Argentine football
2014